The rally of Tunisia  (Rallye de Tunisie) is a rally-raid which was disputed each year in Tunisia from 1981 to 2011.

Editions

References

External links
  Official site

Rally raid races
Pre-Cross Country Rally World Cup races
Motorsport in Tunisia